The Markham Civic Centre is the city hall of the city of Markham, Ontario. The brick and glass Civic Centre was designed by architect Arthur Erickson with Richard Stevens Architects Limited and opened on May 25, 1990.  Entrances, except the great hall entrance, are named after communities in Markham (Unionville, Milliken, Thornhill). The building is adjacent to an 11.5-hectare park with a large pond reflecting the south façade.

Building structure

The three storey complex is home to
 Markham City Council chambers  - Rotunda
 wedding chapel annex
 mayor and councillor offices
 city offices
 public lobby
 winter garden
 executive wing
 council chambers
 committee rooms
 council library and archives

A reflecting pond is located on the south side of the building alongside a 26,000 square foot skating rink - the largest outdoor refrigerated skating rink in the GTA, and operated in the winter months. The skating rink was constructed and officially opened in December 2011. Located next to the civic centre is the Markham Theatre and Unionville High School.

The Civic Centre is a functional building providing office space and a number of public spaces for events in the Great Hall and Lower Atrium. The split level of the Great Hall comes with a two-storey glass front viewing the reflecting pond and wedding chapel.

Bids and winning design

Three architect firms were shortlisted to submitted designs in 1986 for the then Markham Municipal Centre, including Raymond Moriyama Erickson and Barton Myers Associates, but the final design was awarded to Erickson.

Erickson's original design was slightly different, but the Town intervened to keep costs at budget ($14.4 million and $5.2 million for landscaping)

When the building was about to begin construction, Erickson's Toronto office faced financial difficulties.

Sculptures

There is a single piece of art work located to the east side of the Town Centre. The art work is a skeletal town hall theme with a bell attached.

Markham Civic Centre Ice

Located on south side of the building and open during winter, it is an artificial surface rink. In summer months the rink is a large water fountain.

Previous Town Halls 1862-1990

While location of town meeting from 1850 to 1862 are not known, below is a list of some places Markham Town Council have sat:

 Markham Wesleyan Methodist (now St. Andrew's United Church since 1926) 1862-1882: Ontario Vernacular/Italianate/Gothic church used as a meeting place for Markham Village Town Council
 Franklin House 1873-1882: hotel was used as meeting place for Markham Village Town Council; located on the north side of the old village town hall and was demolished with a parking lot now in place.
 Markham Village Town Hall (96 Main Street Markham) 1882-1946 - Italianate structure built by John Wilson 1882 was first permanent home to town council, also home to local jail, storage of volunteer fire brigade equipment and home to Masonic and Oddfellow Lodges; sold in 1946 to become a theatre and now housing private offices
 Markham Village Fire Hall (1950-1970)- dual fire station built 1950 with room for council chambers; fire hall was later demolished and replaced by current Markham Fire and Emergency Services Station 97 - 209 Main Street North
 Buttonville Township Offices - 8911 Woodbine Avenue (1971-1990) - initially built for Buttonville Township Offices in 1950 and the modern/brutalist building has since been demolished and now Chapel Ridge Funeral Home and Cremation Centre

See also

References

Arthur Erickson buildings
City and town halls in Ontario
Buildings and structures in Markham, Ontario
Postmodern architecture in Canada
Tourist attractions in Markham, Ontario
1990 establishments in Ontario